Statistics of Football League First Division in the 1960–61 season.

Overview
Tottenham Hotspur won the First Division title for the second time in the club's history, eight points clear of second-placed Sheffield Wednesday. This remains their last league title.

Newcastle United and Preston North End were relegated, to be replaced by Ipswich Town and Sheffield United who finished first and second in the Second Division that season.

League standings

Results

Top scorers

References

RSSSF

Football League First Division seasons
Eng
1960–61 Football League
1960–61 in English football leagues

lt:Anglijos futbolo varžybos 1960–1961 m.
hu:1960–1961-es angol labdarúgó-bajnokság (első osztály)
ru:Футбольная лига Англии 1960-1961